Tolcher is a surname. Notable people with the surname include:

Arthur Tolcher (1922–1987), British harmonica player
Michael Tolcher (born 1973), American singer-songwriter